Lanciné Sanogo Koné (born 16 June 1979) is an Ivorian professional footballer, who plays as midfielder.

Career
On January 1, 2015, he signed with Persipura Jayapura.

Honours

Club 
Raja Casablanca
Winner
 Botola: 2010–11

Individual 
Persisam Putra Samarinda
 Indonesian Inter Island Cup Top Scorer: 2012

References

External links
 

1979 births
Living people
Ivorian footballers
Ivorian expatriate footballers
Ivorian expatriate sportspeople in Indonesia
Expatriate footballers in Indonesia
Liga 1 (Indonesia) players
Kawkab Marrakech players
Deltras F.C. players
Persisam Putra Samarinda players
Sriwijaya F.C. players
Persipura Jayapura players
Association football midfielders